The 1969 Drexel Dragons football team represented the Drexel Institute of Technology (renamed Drexel University in 1970) as a member of the Middle Atlantic Conference during the 1969 NCAA College Division football season. In their first year under head coach Sterling Brown, the team compiled an overall record of 3–5, with a 2–3 mark in MAC play.

Schedule

References

Drexel
Drexel Dragons football seasons
Drexel Dragons football